PacMin (Pacific Miniatures) is a manufacturer of model aircraft.

History
PacMin was founded in 1946 by two employees of Douglas Aircraft Company. The purpose was to create models for people to see the interior of aircraft in order to get nervous travelers to fly. The company created large cutaway models that became mainstays for travel agencies. PacMin began creating smaller models scaled to one hundredth of the aircraft size which became what the company was known for. 

In 1986 it was purchased by Fred Ouweleen. In 1995 the company relocated to Fullerton, California.  

In a 2015 article, The Jakarta Post wrote that the company is the "world’s biggest plane model manufacturer".

See also 
 List of model aircraft manufacturers

References 

Model aircraft